SAS-1121 is a norbenzomorphan-piperazine that is highly selective for the sigma-2 over the sigma-1 receptor. These are cell surface receptors: that is, proteins in a cell membrane which pass a signal to the cell when some external molecule binds to them. The sigma-2 receptor is significant in cancer and some neurological illnesses.

SAS-1121 is 280-fold selective for the sigma 2 receptor (Ki = 23.8 nM) over the sigma 1 receptor (Ki = 6659.6 nM) and served as a tool compound to help identify the sigma 2 receptor as transmembrane 97 (TMEM97).

References 

j

Piperazines